The 12th Parliament of Pakistan was the unicameral legislature of Pakistan formed after the 11th Parliament of Pakistan. There were 342 Members of Parliament, including 56 for Women and 10 for Minorities.

KPK
  Shabbir Ahmed Khan
  Maulana Rehmatullah Khalil
  Qari Fayaz-ur-Rehman Alvi
  Shabir Hussain Awan
  Qazi Hussain Ahmed
  Maulana Hamidul-Haq Haqqani
  Maulana Muhammad Gohar Shah
  Aftab Ahmad Khan Sherpao
  Maulana Shujaul-Mulk
  Moulana Mohammad Qasim
  Ata-ur-Rahman
  Muhammad Usman
  Maulana Khalil Ahmad
  Mufti Ibrar Sultan
  Maulana Shah Abdul Aziz
  Akhunzada Muhammad Sadiq
  Amanullah Khan Jadoon
  Sardar Muhammad Yaqub
  Omar Ayub Khan
  Sardar Shah Jahan Yousaf
  Maulana Abdul Malik
  Qari Muhammad Yousaf
  Maulvi Abdul Halim Khan
  Maulana Fazalur-Rehman
  Atta-ur-Rehman
  Maulana Syed Nasib Ali Shah
  Maulana Amanullah Khan
  Sher Akbar Khan
  Qari Abdul Bais Siddiqui
  Fazle Subhan
  Amir Muqam
  Maulana Abdul Akbar Chitrali
  Maulana Asadullah
  Maulana Ahmad Ghafoor

FATA
  Maulana Ghulam Muhammad Sadiq
  Syed Javed Hussain
  Munir Khan Orakzai
  Syed Ghazi Gulab Jamal
  Maulana Syed Nek Zaman
  Maulana Abdul Malik Wazir
  Maulana Mohammad Merajuddin
  Sheikh Alhadees Maulana Muhammad Sadiq
  Sahibzada Haroon Rashid
  Muhammad Noor- ul-Haq Qadri
  Maulana Khalilur-Rehman Afridi
  Naseem Gul Afridi

Islamabad
  Mian Muhammad Aslam
Syed Nayyar Hussain Bokhari

Punjab
  Ghulam Murtaza Satti
  Raja Pervez Ashraf
  Nisar Ali Khan
  Ghulam Sarwar Khan
  Zammurd Khan
  Sheikh Rashid Ahmed
  Muhammad Hanif Abbasi
  Malik Amin Aslam Khan
  Malik Allah Yar Khan
  Shaukat Aziz
  Tahir Iqbal
  Muhammad Faez Tamman
  Ch. Shahbaz Hussain
  Raja Muhammad Asad Khan
  Inam ul Haq Piracha
  Ch. Ghias Ahmed Mela
  Tasneem Ahmed Qureshi
  Anwar Ali Cheema
  Mazhar Ahmed Qureshi
  Sumaira Malik
  Malik Muhammad Saifullah Tiwana
  Imran Khan
  Sher Afghan Khan Niazi
  Muhammad Sanaullah Khan Mastikhel
  Rashid Akbar Khan
  Ghulam Rasool Sahi
  Muhammad Wasi Zafar
  Muhammad Asim Nazir
  Rajab Ali Khan Baloch
  Rana Asif Tauseef
  Nisar Ahmed
  Muhammad Fazal Karim
  Mushtaq Ali Cheema
  Abid Sher Ali
  Raja Nadir Pervaiz Khan
  Muhammad Tahir Shah
  Ghulam Bibi Bharwana
  Faisal Saleh Hayat
  Sheikh Waqqas Akram
  Saima Akhtar Bharwana
  Muhammad Mehboob Sultan
  Amjad Ali Warriach
  Mian Muhammad Farhan Latif
  Riaz Fatyana
  Ch. Imranullah
  Qazi Hamidullah Khan
  Shahid Akram Bhinder
  Imtiaz Safdar Warriach
  Rana Omer Nazir Ahmed Khan
  Ch. Ahmad Raza
  Ch. Bilal Ejaz
  Hamid Nasir Chattha
  Mehdi Hassan Bhatti
  Ch. Liaqat Abbas
  Ch. Wajahat Hussain
  Ch. Shujaat Hussain
  Qamar Zaman Kaira
  Rehman Naseer Chaudhry
  Aijaz Ahmed Chaudhry
  Zulfiqar Ali Gondal
  Khawaja Muhammad Asif
  Ch. Amir Hussain
  Umar Ahmad Ghuman
  Ali Asjid Malhi
  Zahid Hamid
  Muhammad Nasir Khan
  Danial Aziz Chaudhry
  Riffat Javaid Kahlon
  Hafiz Salman Butt
  Khawaja Saad Rafique
  Mohammad Pervaiz Malik
  Farid Ahmad Paracha
  Sardar Ayaz Sadiq
  Muhammad Javed Hashmi
  Aitzaz Ahsan
  Hamayun Akhtar Khan
  Liaqat Baloch
  Tahir-ul-Qadri
  Zaheer Abbas Khokhar
  Habibullah Warraich
  Samina Khalid Ghurki
  Zulfiqar Ahmed Dhillon
  Mian Jalil Ahmad
  Muhammad Saeed Virk
  Khurram Munawar Manj
  Mian Shamim Haider
  Bilal Ahmed Virk
  Rai Mansab Ali Khan
  Sardar Tufail Ahmed Khan
  Ch. Manzoor Ahmed
  Mian Khursheed Mahmud Kasuri
  Sardar Muhammad Asif Nakai
  Sardar Talib Hassan Nakai
  Rai Muhammad Aslam Kharal
  Rao Sikandar Iqbal
  Syed Gulzar Sibtain Shah
  Rao Muhammad Ajmal Khan
  Rubina Shaheen Wattoo
  Shah Mahmood Qureshi
  Malik Liaquat Ali Dogar
  Rana Mahmoodul-Hassan
  Sikandar Hayat Khan Bosan
  Syed Asad Murtaza Gillani
  Syed Jafar Hussain Bukhari
  Nawab Aman Ullah Khan
  Muhammad Akhtar Khan Kanju
  Muhammad Raza Hayat Hiraj
  Hamid Yar Hiraj
  Pir Muhammad Aslam Bodla
  Ghulam Murtaza Maitla
  Ch. Nouraiz Shakoor Khan
  Rana Tariq Javed
  Rai Aziz Ullah Khan
  Saeed Ahmed Chaudhry
  Pir Muhammad Shah Khaggah
  Ahmed Raza Maneka
  Junaid Mumtaz Joya
  Ch. Nazir Ahmed Jatt
  Ishaq Khan Khakwani
  Aftab Ahmed Khan Khiachi
  Azhar Ahmed Khan
  Khawaja Sheraz Mahmood
  Sardar Farooq Ahmed Khan
  Awais Ahmad Khan
  Sardar Muhammad Jaffar Khan
  Muhammad Nasrullah Khan
  Khalida Mohsin Ali Qureshi
  Hina Rabbani Khar
  Muhammad Shahid Jamil Qureshi
  Makhdumzada Basti Bokhari
  Abdul Qayyum Khan Jatoi
  Sardar Bahadur Ahmed Khan
  Malik Niaz Ahmed Jakhar
  Makhdoom Syed Ali Hassan Gilani
  Aamir Yar Malik
  Muhammad Farooq Azam Malik
  Riaz Hussain Pirzada
  Syed Tasneem Nawaz Gardezi
  Syed Muhammad Asghar Shah
  Mian Mumtaz Matyana
  Tahir Bashir Cheema
  Muhammad Ijaz- ul-Haq
  Syed Ahmad Alam Anwar
  Tanvir Hussain Syed
  Makhdoom Khusro Bakhtyar
  Jehangir Khan Tareen
  Zafar Iqbal Warraich
  Rais Munir Ahmed
  Muhammad Aftab

Sindh
 Syed Khurshid Ahmed Shah
  Abdul Mujeeb Pirzada
  Khalid Ahmed Khan Lund
  Ali Nawaz Mahar
  Muhammad Ibrahim Jatoi
  Ghous Bux Khan Mahar
  Muhammad Anwar Bughio
  Hizbullah Bughio
  Khalid Iqbal Memon
  Shahid Hussain Bhutto
  Meer Aijaz Hussain Jakhrani
  Hazar Khan Bijarani
  Sardar Saleem Khan Mazari
  Abdul Ghaffar Khan Jatoi
  Syed Zafar Ali Shah
  Azra Fazal Pechuho
  Syed Ghulam Mustafa Shah
  Manzoor Hussain Wassan
  Syed Javed Ali Shah Jilani
  Syed Fazal Ali Shah Jeelani
  Makhdoom Amin Fahim
  Khalid Wahab
  Abul Khair Mohammad Zubair
  Syed Amir Ali Shah
  Syed Naveed Qamar Shah
  Shamshad Sattar Bachani
  Ghulam Ali Nizamani
  Fahmida Mirza
  Syed Aftab Hussain Shah Jillani
  Syed Qurban Ali Shah
  Muhammad Yousuf Talpur
  Arbab Zakaullah
  Ghulam Hyder Samejo
  Abdul Ghani Talpur
  Rafique Ahmed Jamali
  Liaqat Ali Jatoi
  Khuda Bux Nizamani
  Abdul Quddus Rajar
  Liaquat Ali Marri
  Syed Ayaz Ali Shah Sherazi
  Muhammad Ali Malkani
  Hakim Qari Gul Rehman
  Abid Ali Umang
  Laeeque Khan
  Abdul Kadir Khanzada
  Abdul Waseem
  Syed Haider Abbas Shah Rizvi
  Kunwar Khalid Younus
  Nisar Ahmed Panhwar
  Israr- ul-Ebad Khan
  Nabil Ahmed Gabol
  Aamer Liaquat Hussain
  Abdus Sattar Afghani
  Syed Safwan Ullah Shah
  Muhammad Hussain Mehanti
  Asadullah Bhutto
  Nawab Mirza
  Farooq Sattar
  Iqbal Muhammad Ali Khan
  Muhammad Shamim Siddiqui
  Sher Muhammad Baloch

Balochistan
Fazal Ahmed Ghazi
  Molvi Noor Muhammad
  Hafiz Hussain Ahmed
  Gul Muhammad Dummar
  Mahmood Khan Achakzai
  Sardar Muhammad Yaqoob Khan Nasir
  Muhammad Khan Sherani
  Mir Haider Bughti
  Mir Zafrullah Khan Jamali
  Yar Muhammad Rind
  Abdul Ghafoor Haidri
  Abdul Rauf Mengal
  Abdul Qadir Jamaluddin
  Maulana Rehmatullah Baluch
  Zobaida Jalal

Women

Minorities
  Akram Masih Gill
  Ch. Haroon Qaiser
  Gayan Chand Singh
  M.P. Bhandara
  Mushtaq Victor
  Ramesh Lal
  Pervaiz Masih
  Asiya Nasir
  Krishan Bheel
  Dev Das

See also 

 List of members of the 1st National Assembly of Pakistan
 List of members of the 2nd National Assembly of Pakistan
 List of members of the 3rd National Assembly of Pakistan
 List of members of the 4th National Assembly of Pakistan
 List of members of the 5th National Assembly of Pakistan
 List of members of the 6th National Assembly of Pakistan
 List of members of the 7th National Assembly of Pakistan
 List of members of the 8th National Assembly of Pakistan
 List of members of the 9th National Assembly of Pakistan
 List of members of the 10th National Assembly of Pakistan
 List of members of the 11th National Assembly of Pakistan
 List of members of the 12th National Assembly of Pakistan
 List of members of the 13th National Assembly of Pakistan
 List of members of the 14th National Assembly of Pakistan
 List of members of the 15th National Assembly of Pakistan

References

External links
 National Assembly of Pakistan

Pakistani MNAs 2002–2007
Lists of members of the National Assembly of Pakistan by term